Sander Westerveld (born 23 October 1974) is a Dutch football coach and former professional player who played as a goalkeeper. He was the goalkeeping coach of South African Premier Soccer League club Ajax Cape Town.

The highlight of his playing career, spent in five countries, was a treble of the FA Cup, League Cup and UEFA Cup with Liverpool in 2001. Westerveld was included in the Netherlands' squads for Euro 2000 and Euro 2004, but, due to the consistency of Edwin van der Sar, earned six international caps over five years.

Club career

Early career and Liverpool
Westerveld's first professional match was for FC Twente in 1994. After two seasons there he moved to Vitesse for three.

Following the 1998–99 season, during which he helped Vitesse to qualify for Europe, Westerveld was sold to Liverpool, where he succeeded David James. He became the most expensive goalkeeper in British football when he joined the Reds for a reported fee of £4 million during the summer of 1999. Westerveld made his Liverpool debut against Sheffield Wednesday on 7 August 1999 in a 2–1 away win. Then on 28 August 1999 he saved a Davor Šuker penalty as Liverpool beat Arsenal 2–0. He was Gérard Houllier's first choice to succeed James as Anfield's number one, and Westerveld fully justified the manager's confidence by playing a leading role in Liverpool's return to Europe, conceding the fewest goals in the 1999–2000 Premier League season.

He played a key role in the treble season of 2000–01 for Liverpool, emerging as the hero of the League Cup final victory over Birmingham City, making the winning save from Andrew Johnson in the penalty shoot-out.

However, towards the end of his two-season spell at Liverpool, he was often subjected to criticism from the media. After a major mistake in a match against Bolton Wanderers on 27 August 2001 he was put on the bench by Houllier, who promptly signed two new goalkeepers, Jerzy Dudek and Chris Kirkland. He did not play again after the Bolton error, and was sold to Real Sociedad of La Liga on 16 December 2001, for £3.4 million.

Real Sociedad
Sociedad were runners-up in La Liga in the 2002–03 season, and played in the following season's Champions League. However, that season saw him loaned to RCD Mallorca, where Miguel Ángel Moyá kept him out of the team. His contract then expired.

Portsmouth
In July 2005 he moved back to the Premier League with Portsmouth, being signed by Alain Perrin on a one-year contract. He was expected to be the first choice goalkeeper, ahead of Jamie Ashdown and Kostas Chalkias. However, after an inconsistent time at Fratton Park, in which he played only 6 league matches, he was allowed to move on a 28-day loan to Everton, rivals of his former club Liverpool, on 24 February 2006. Everton had a temporary goalkeeping crisis in which Nigel Martyn, Richard Wright and Iain Turner were all unavailable, and Westerveld played two matches for them. When he returned to Portsmouth, he remained a substitute and was released by Harry Redknapp on 11 May 2006.

Later career
On 28 July 2006, Westerveld signed with Segunda División club UD Almería for one season, in which he helped them to achieve promotion to La Liga before leaving the club at the end of his contract.

On 7 September 2007, he joined Sparta Rotterdam on a short-term contract and in May 2008 he announced that he was to leave Sparta.

During the summer of 2009 he signed for Italian Lega Pro Prima Divisione club A.C. Monza Brianza 1912, after a successful trial with the club. He later joined Ajax Cape Town in South Africa where he was the number 1 goalkeeper. At the end of the 2012–13 season, his contract was terminated and he then became a goalkeeping coach at the club.

International career
Westerveld made his debut for the Netherlands on 8 June 1999, in an away friendly 3–1 defeat to Brazil in Goiânia. He was included in the Dutch squad for Euro 2000, and played the last group match against France, both teams being already qualified. The last of his six caps came on 28 February 2001, in a 0–0 friendly home draw with Turkey, although he did make the squad for Euro 2004.

Personal life
Westerveld's father-in-law Hennie Ardesch, and son Sem Westerveld, are also professional football goalkeepers.

Career statistics

Honours
Liverpool
FA Cup: 2000–01
Football League Cup: 2000–01
FA Charity Shield: 2001
UEFA Cup: 2000–01
UEFA Super Cup: 2001

References

External links
LFCHistory.net profile
Everton FC profile

Player profile – Sparta Rotterdam
Career stats – Voetbal International 

1974 births
Living people
Footballers from Enschede
Dutch footballers
Netherlands international footballers
Association football goalkeepers
FC Twente players
SBV Vitesse players
Liverpool F.C. players
Real Sociedad footballers
RCD Mallorca players
Portsmouth F.C. players
Everton F.C. players
UD Almería players
Sparta Rotterdam players
A.C. Monza players
Cape Town Spurs F.C. players
Eredivisie players
Premier League players
La Liga players
Segunda División players
UEFA Euro 2000 players
UEFA Euro 2004 players
UEFA Cup winning players
Dutch expatriate footballers
Expatriate footballers in England
Expatriate footballers in Italy
Expatriate soccer players in South Africa
Expatriate footballers in Spain
Dutch expatriate sportspeople in England
Dutch expatriate sportspeople in Italy
Dutch expatriate sportspeople in South Africa
Dutch expatriate sportspeople in Spain
Association football goalkeeping coaches
Cape Town Spurs F.C. non-playing staff
FA Cup Final players